Ricardo Luis Pozzi Rodrigues (born May 23, 1976), better known as Ricardinho, is a Brazilian football pundit, manager and retired footballer. He usually played as a deep-lying playmaker in midfield, and was best known for his accurate passing and technique.

International career
Ricardinho earned 23 caps for the Brazilian national team, the first on March 28, 2000, in a match against Colombia. He was called up by Luiz Felipe Scolari for the 2002 FIFA World Cup as a late replacement for Emerson who was injured before the tournament began. He appeared in three matches as a substitute during the tournament as Brazil won the World Cup for the record fifth time.

On August 17, 2005, he scored his first international goal in a friendly match against Croatia, an equalizer in the 41st minute as Brazil drew 1–1 with Croatia.

He was selected by Brazil coach Carlos Alberto Parreira among the 23 footballers to participate in the 2006 FIFA World Cup. He appeared in two matches as a substitute, against Japan and Ghana. In the latter, he made an assist to a late goal scored by midfielder Zé Roberto.

Managerial statistics

1.Includes league, cup, state championships and CONMEBOL competitions.

Honours

Player
SC Corinthians
Campeonato Brasileiro Série A: 1998, 1999
FIFA Club World Championship: 2000
Brazilian Cup: 2002
Rio-São Paulo Tournament: 2002

Santos
Campeonato Brasileiro Série A: 2004

Beşiktaş J.K.
Turkish Cup: 2007
Brazil
FIFA World Cup: 2002

Manager
Paraná Clube
Campeonato Paranaense Série B: 2012

Santa Cruz
Campeonato Pernambucano: 2015

Notes

External links
Ricardinho Profile from his official site

1976 births
Living people
Brazilian people of Italian descent
Brazilian people of Portuguese descent
Footballers from São Paulo
Brazilian footballers
Association football midfielders
Paraná Clube players
FC Girondins de Bordeaux players
Sport Club Corinthians Paulista players
São Paulo FC players
Middlesbrough F.C. players
Santos FC players
Beşiktaş J.K. footballers
Al-Rayyan SC players
Clube Atlético Mineiro players
Esporte Clube Bahia players
Campeonato Brasileiro Série A players
Ligue 1 players
Süper Lig players
Qatar Stars League players
Brazilian expatriate footballers
Expatriate footballers in France
Expatriate footballers in England
Expatriate footballers in Turkey
Expatriate footballers in Qatar
Brazilian expatriate sportspeople in France
Brazilian expatriate sportspeople in England
Brazilian expatriate sportspeople in Turkey
Brazilian expatriate sportspeople in Qatar
Brazil international footballers
2002 FIFA World Cup players
2003 FIFA Confederations Cup players
2006 FIFA World Cup players
FIFA World Cup-winning players
Brazilian football managers
Campeonato Brasileiro Série B managers
Paraná Clube managers
Ceará Sporting Club managers
Avaí FC managers
Santa Cruz Futebol Clube managers
Associação Portuguesa de Desportos managers
Tupi Football Club managers
Londrina Esporte Clube managers